Southern Pride is a 1917 American silent drama film directed by Henry King and starring Gail Kane, Cora Drew, and John Vosper.

Cast
 Gail Kane as Lucie De Montrand 
 Cora Drew as Tante Jeanne 
 John Vosper as Francois De Montand 
 Robert Klein as Gasper La Roche 
 Spottiswoode Aitken as Father Mort 
 George Periolat as James Morgan 
 Lew Cody as Robert Orme

References

Bibliography
 Donald W. McCaffrey & Christopher P. Jacobs. Guide to the Silent Years of American Cinema. Greenwood Publishing, 1999.

External links
 

1917 films
1910s mystery films
American mystery films
Films directed by Henry King
American silent feature films
1910s English-language films
American black-and-white films
Silent mystery films
1910s American films